The Bowman Coast is the portion of the east coast of the Antarctic Peninsula between Cape Northrop and Cape Agassiz.  It was discovered by Sir Hubert Wilkins in an aerial flight of December 20, 1928.  It was named by Wilkins for Isaiah Bowman, then Director of the American Geographical Society.

Maps
Antarctic Digital Database (ADD). Scale 1:250000 topographic map of Antarctica. Scientific Committee on Antarctic Research (SCAR). Since 1993, regularly upgraded and updated.

See also
Graham Land

Further reading 
 Ute Christina Herzfeld, Atlas of Antarctica: Topographic Maps from Geostatistical Analysis of Satellite Radar Altimeter Data, PP 114, 168
 A. P. Crary, L. M. Gould, E. O. Hulburt, Hugh Odishow, Waldo E. Smith, editors, Antarctica in the International Geophysical Year, P 53

External links 

 
Coasts of Graham Land
Geography of the British Antarctic Territory